Anolis barkeri, Barker's anole , is a species of lizard in the family Dactyloidae. The species is found in Mexico.

References

Anoles
Reptiles described in 1939
Endemic reptiles of Mexico
Taxa named by Karl Patterson Schmidt